Polk is an unincorporated community in Jackson County, West Virginia, United States.

References 

Unincorporated communities in West Virginia
Unincorporated communities in Jackson County, West Virginia
West Virginia populated places on the Ohio River